The nineteenth series of the British television drama series Grange Hill began broadcasting on 23 January 1996, before ending on 28 March 1996 on BBC One. The series follows the lives of the staff and pupils of the eponymous school, an inner-city London comprehensive school. It consists of twenty episodes.

Cast

Pupils

Teachers

Others

Episodes

DVD release
The nineteenth series of Grange Hill has never been released on DVD as of 2014.

Notes

References

1996 British television seasons
Grange Hill